Ravi Chandra is a 1980 Kannada-language romantic drama film directed by A. V. Sheshagiri Rao, written by Shankar-Sundar and produced by Parvathamma Rajkumar. The film starred Rajkumar in dual roles  along with Lakshmi and Sumalatha. Veteran actress Savitri featured in a prominent role in this film. This was Sumalatha's debut film in Kannada. The screenplay, dialogues and lyrics are written by Chi. Udaya Shankar.

Cast 
 Rajkumar in dual roles as Ravi and Chandra
 Lakshmi
 Sumalatha (Voice dubbed by B. Jayashree)
 Savitri
 Vajramuni
 Prabhakar
 Papamma
 Shivaprakash

Soundtrack 
The music was composed by Upendra Kumar with lyrics by Chi. Udaya Shankar. All the songs composed for the film were received extremely well.

References

External links 
 

1980 films
1980s Kannada-language films
Indian romantic drama films
Films with screenplays by Chi. Udayashankar
Films directed by A. V. Seshagiri Rao
1980 romantic drama films